Abbas Kiarostami was an Iranian film director, screenwriter, poet, photographer and film producer whose filmmaking career spanned more than 40 years.

Films

See also
Persian cinema
List of Iranian films

References

External links

Filmography
Kiarostami, Abbas
 
Kiarostami, Abbas